Westerhout 49-2 (W49-2) is a very massive and luminous star in the H II region Westerhout 49.

Properties 
Westerhout 49-2 is located within the H II region Westerhout 49, about 11.1 kiloparsecs from the Sun. The star is heavily reddened, by nearly 5 magnitudes in the K band, the most of any star in the region. Westerhout 49-2 is classified as an evolved slash star, with a spectral type of O2-3.5If*.

Uncertainties 
There is significant uncertainty about Westerhout 49-2's properties. Its mass is likely higher than the theoretical upper limit of 150 M☉, which means it could be a binary, if x-rays are detected. Westerhout 49-1, 49-2 and 49-12 are all bright x-ray sources, which means they could all be binary stars and their masses would be lower than the predicted mass if they were single stars.

Notes

References

O-type supergiants
Aquila (constellation)
Emission-line stars